The 2005 Big 12 Conference baseball tournament was held at AT&T Bricktown Ballpark in Oklahoma City, OK from May 25 through 29.  Nebraska won their fourth tournament in seven years and earned the Big 12 Conference's automatic bid to the 2005 NCAA Division I baseball tournament. This was the last year that the tournament mirrored the format of the College World Series, with two 4-team double-elimination brackets and a final championship game.

Regular Season Standings
Source:

Colorado and Iowa State did not sponsor baseball teams.

Tournament

 * indicates extra-inning game.
 and  did not make the tournament.

All-Tournament team

See also
College World Series
NCAA Division I Baseball Championship
Big 12 Conference baseball tournament

References

Big 12 Tourney media guide 
Boydsworld 2005 Standings

Tournament
Big 12 Conference Baseball Tournament
Big 12 Conference baseball tournament
Big 12 Conference baseball tournament
Baseball competitions in Oklahoma City
College sports tournaments in Oklahoma